Pickles is a surname.

People
Albert Pickles (1877–1958), English association football player and manager
 Christina Pickles (born 1935), British born American actress
 Christopher Pickles (born 1966), English cricketer
 David Pickles (1935–2020), English cricketer
 Eric Pickles (born 1952), British conservative politician
 James Pickles (1925–2010), British judge and newspaper columnist
 Lewis Pickles (born 1932), English cricketer
 Vivian Pickles (born 1931), English actress
 Wilfred Pickles (1904–1978), English actor and radio presenter
 William Pickles (doctor) (1885–1962), English epidemiologist

Fictional
The Pickles family from Rugrats
Mr. Pickles, the main protagonist of the show of the same name

See also
 People section of;
 Pickel (disambiguation)
 Pickle (disambiguation)